Dymek is a Polish surname. Notable people with the surname include:

Jarek Dymek (born 1971), Polish strongman 
Walenty Dymek (1988–1956), Polish Roman Catholic archbishop

See also
 
 Dymek

Polish-language surnames